The 1986 Cal State Fullerton Titans softball team represented California State University, Fullerton in the 1986 NCAA Division I softball season.  The Titans were coached by Judi Garman, who led her seventh season.  The Titans finished with a record of 57–9–1.  They competed in the Pacific Coast Athletic Association, where they finished first with a 22–5–1 record.

The Titans were invited to the 1986 NCAA Division I softball tournament, where they swept the West Regional and then completed a run through the Women's College World Series to claim their first NCAA Women's College World Series Championship.

Roster

Schedule

References

Cal State Fullerton
Cal State Fullerton Titans softball seasons
Cal State Fullerton Softball
Women's College World Series seasons
NCAA Division I softball tournament seasons
Big West Conference softball champion seasons